Kofi Adu (born May 25, 1969),is originally from the Ashanti Region of Ghana but lived in a suburb in Accra Newtown called Asantewaa, also known as Agya Koo, is an actor and comedian from Ghana. He has appeared in over 200 Ghanaian movies including Obaatanpa, Away Bus, Black Star, and Ma Tricki Wo.

Career
Adu is originally from the Ashanti Region of Ghana, but lived in a suburb in Accra Newtown called Asantewaa. He worked as a cobbler. Adu was discovered on a Ghanaian comedy show on GTV (Ghana National Television) at the National Theater in Accra, where he worked as a comedian warming up the crowd before the main drama is staged.

In July 2008, he was awarded a National Award by then-Ghanaian President John Agyekum Kufuor. Although he originally journeyed to Accra to sing, Agya Koo has been featured in many Ghanaian movies, 15 of which remain his favorite.

Avoiding the normal procedure of thoroughly reading a script before acting in films, he told Joy FM's former morning show host Kojo Oppong Nkrumah that while actors and actresses are typically given scripts two weeks before they begin shooting, his God-given talent allows him to improvise without a script.

He has been in movies with Aboagye Brenya, Lil Win, Kwaku Manu, Mercy Aseidu to name a few.

Personal life 
In June 2016, Adu got remarried to Rita Asiedu in London, UK after dating for 4 years. He was previously married to Victoria Owusu Adomako but divorced. He is a Christian

Filmography

Key Soap Concert Party
Agya Koo Gbegbentus
Three Desperate Friends
House of Commotion
Evil Plot To Break My Home
Kumasi Yonko (meaning - Kumasi Friendship)
Obi nnim awie ye (meaning - No one knows the end)
Ka wonan toso (meaning - Sit properly)
Asew 419A (meaning - In-law 419A)
Business Partner
Gyina Pintin (meaning - Stand Firm)
Bone So Akatua (meaning - Rewards of Evil)
Obaatanpa (meaning - Good Mother)
Black Star
Otan Hunu Kwah
Ma Tricki Wo (meaning - I have tricked you)
Agya Koo Trotro Driver
Joni Waka
Ohia (meaning - Poverty)
Away Bus
Nsem Pii (meaning - Many Issues)
Sure banker
Bosom Ba
Kwadwo Besiah
Sika ye Mogya
Nyame Bekyere1&2Agya Koo MechanicAburokyire Abrabo (meaning - Life Abroad)Agya Koo Bank ManagerAsem Aba Fie (meaning - An Issue at Home)Kankan NyameOnyame AsemAgya Koo GyaeKayayooMy Soldier FatherObidea Aba (meaning - It's the turn of another)Nnipa Sei Nnipa'' (meaning - Humans destroy themselves)

References 

Ghanaian comedians
Ghanaian male film actors
1969 births
Living people
People from Kumasi